Habeas Corpus is a silent short subject co-directed by Leo McCarey and James Parrott starring comedy duo Laurel and Hardy. It was released by Metro-Goldwyn-Mayer on December 1, 1928

Plot

Professor Padilla is a mad scientist whose plans have drawn the interest of the police. His latest scheme is to perform a medical experiment on a corpse. Over the supper table, as Professor Padilla is contemplating a new theory that the human brain has a level surface, there's a knock on the door. Stan and Ollie, by chance, happen to arrive at the professor's home in search of a free meal. The professor offers the duo $500 if they will steal a body from a local graveyard. They think the professor is barmy, but they agree to his offer anyway. The conversation is overheard by the professor's butler, Ledoux, who happens to be a police informant. Ledoux calls police headquarters and is told to go to the graveyard to thwart any theft. Meanwhile, the police arrest the mad professor. At the cemetery, Stan and Ollie get into a series of comical misadventures trying to enter the grounds and while digging up a fresh grave. Ledoux manages to slip into the grave while covered in a white sack. Stan and Ollie take Ledoux from the grave. With Ledoux's "corpse" slung over Stan's back, Ledoux's legs rip through the bottom of the sack—and he walks step for step behind Stan. Stan and Ollie realize their stolen corpse is still alive and begin to run in panic. The chase ends with Ollie and Ledoux falling into a deep, water-filled hole.

Cast
 Stan Laurel as Stan
 Oliver Hardy as Ollie
 Richard Carle as Professor Padilla
 Charley Rogers as Ledoux
 Charles A. Bachman as Detective
Leo Sulky as Detective on telephone

Production notes
Habeas Corpus was filmed on July 16–24 & 30–31, 1928. Although technically a silent film — having intertitles and no synchronized dialogue — it was the inaugural Hal Roach film released with a synchronized music and sounds effects track for theatres wired for sound. The Victor sound discs were thought lost until a set surfaced in the 1990s and was reunited with the film elements.

The concept of men trolling through a cemetery with a dead body was reworked by The Three Stooges in their 1945 film Three Pests in a Mess.

Reception

Horror film author Christopher Workman commented, "One sequence involving the comedy team's attempts to get over the graveyard wall takes up entirely too much running time and mires the proceedings in excessive tedium. Comedic incidents accumulate until the film has reached the requisite running time".

See also 
 Laurel and Hardy films

References

External links 
 
 
 
 

1928 films
1928 comedy films
American silent short films
American black-and-white films
Films directed by James Parrott
Films directed by Leo McCarey
Laurel and Hardy (film series)
Mad scientist films
Metro-Goldwyn-Mayer short films
Films with screenplays by H. M. Walker
1928 short films
American comedy short films
1920s American films
Silent American comedy films
Silent horror films